Loretto Abbey Catholic Secondary School (sporadically known as Loretto Abbey CSS, LACSS, Loretto Abbey, LAT, Loretto Abbey Toronto or Abbey) is an all-girls Catholic secondary school in Hogg's Hollow neighbourhood of Toronto, Ontario, Canada. Established by the Loretto Sisters in 1847, it is one of Toronto's oldest educational institutions and is part of the Toronto Catholic District School Board (then the Metropolitan Separate School Board) since 1987.

Loretto Abbey operates on the non-semestered system offering Advanced Placement, academic and applied courses; approximately 85% of the school's courses are offered at the academic level, educating girls to university-entrance standards.
The school offers co-operative education, extended French, Advanced Placement programmes and special education (resource and gifted).

History
The school was established as an all girls private school in 1847 by Irish Sisters of Loreto (also known as the Institute of the Blessed Virgin Mary, also known as IBVM, founded in France by the Venerable Mary Ward, an English recusant, in 1609). Ward advocated excellent education for young women, which has always formed part of the ethos of Loretto schools.

The Loreto Sisters arrived in Toronto from Rathfarnham, Ireland, in 1847 at the invitation of Michael Power, the first Roman Catholic bishop of Toronto. The school was named after their previous home of Loreto Abbey near Dublin. The first superior of the Toronto community and principal of the school was Mother Teresa Ellen Dease, I.B.V.M.

Originally located on Duke Street, Loretto Abbey moved to a Bathurst Street site and then to Bond Street in 1860. In 1867 the school relocated to the former mansion of Attorney General Robert James on Wellington Street. In 1927, the school moved to its current home, a Collegiate Gothic Tudor style building on Mason Boulevard by architects Findlay and Foulis. The school is attached to Loretto Abbey, the motherhouse of the Loretto Sisters in Canada. At one time, the Mason Boulevard building housed boarders and a private primary school in addition to the secondary school. The primary school, which was also run by the Loreto Sisters resident in the attached convent, closed in 1985.

Loretto Abbey under MSSB/TCDSB rule (1967–present)
In 1967, at the request of the Ontario Bishops, students in Grades 9 and 10 were placed under the Metropolitan Separate School Board and no longer had to pay tuition. Fees were still charged for Grades 11–13. In 1984, the Ontario government began funding the last three years of high school and the Abbey role as a private school was abolished. On January 1, 1998, the MSSB became the Toronto Catholic District School Board.

In 2011, the Loretto Sisters agreed to a sale of the entire Abbey to the TCDSB, with the exception of the infirmary, and this will greatly increase the space available for classrooms and other facilities.  The sale to the school board preserves one of the oldest Catholic schools in Canada.

Toronto City Council intends to designate the lands and buildings known municipally as 101 Mason Boulevard (Loretto Abbey), under Part IV, Section 29 of the Ontario Heritage Act. "

Fraser Institute ranking
Loretto Abbey Catholic Secondary School has a ranking of 79 out of 623 in the most recent five years as follows: 7.3 in 2012, 8.2 in 2013, 8.1 in 2014, 7.8 in 2015, and 7.1 in 2016.

The Fraser Institute's 2015-16 report on Loretto Abbey Catholic Secondary School gave it an overall grade of 7.1/10, ranking it at 201 of 740 secondary schools in Ontario.

Campus and facilities
The historic Tudor-gothic school building is located in a green neighbourhood adjacent to the Don Valley. The school has access to the Chapel in the Abbey, a pool, a gymnasium, computer facilities, a library, a 300-seat auditorium, a courtyard, a prayer garden and grotto, and a playing field.

The Abbey campus was used as a filming location for the 2002 Disney movie, Cadet Kelly.

Co-curricular programme and traditions
Loretto Abbey offers a wide range of service, social, and athletic activities to develop students to their full potential.

Clubs and Teams: Abbey Singers, Abbey Times, Asian Association, Multicultural Club, Volunteer's Club, Sewing Club, Amnesty International, Anime Club, South Asian Association, Build to Learn Club – B2L, Current Issues, Debate Team, Dance Team, Daughters of the Immaculate Heart of Mary, Economics Club, ESP (Empowered Student Partnership), Environmental Club, Filipino Club, Image Arts Club, Improv Team, In the Driver's Seat, Irish Club, Italian Club, Knitting Club, LAT Concert Choir, LAT Voice, Loretto Leaders, Mock Trial, Peer Tutors, Portuguese Club, Reach For the Top, Sailing Club, Science Club, Skills Canada Team, Spanish Club, Urban Nations, Women Against Violence, Yearbook Club, Music Council, Concert Bands, Jazz Ensemble, Loretto Abbey Peace and Development.

Sports: badminton, basketball, cross country, curling, field hockey, golf, hockey, ski team, soccer, soft ball, swimming, table tennis, tennis, track and field, volleyball.

Some annual traditions at Loretto include: Mother & Daughter Tea, Loretto Abbey Film Festival, Christmas Baskets, International Picnic, Multicultural Night, Father and Daughter Barbecue, Academic Awards Night, March Break Trips (International), Musical Performance at the Cardinal's Dinner, Semi-Formal, Pasta Night, Spring Concert, Annual Drama Production, Fashion Show and many more.

Overseas programmes
Loretto Abbey students participated in the 2009 India Study and Leadership Programme. The students participated in service learning and volunteered at Loretto schools in Calcutta, Darjeeling, and New Delhi. This excursion was in celebration of the 400th anniversary of the Loretto Sisters and marked an ongoing involvement of the Sisters in maintaining the Mary Ward ethos at the school. The third trip occurred in March, 2012.

The Abbey also fundraises every year for Loretto schools overseas and for charities in need. In 2007, for instance, $25,000 was raised for Loreto St. Vincent's Primary School in Darjeeling. $10,000 was raised for the new Loreto school is South Sudan in 2012. Proceeds from events like dances and civies day go towards the annual charity.

Alumnae

 Shelley Solmes – CBC Radio 2 host
 Carly Foulkes – model and actress
 Jordan Sinclair - golden globes awarded actress
 Germaine Guèvremont – writer and winner of the 1950 Governor-General's Award
 Ida Hawley – actress
 Yolanda Gampp – Host of How to Cake It
 Anna Olson – TV Host and professionally trained chef 
 Sister Margaret O'Neill (Mother Agatha) – founder of Loretto College at University of Toronto
 Ivana Santilli – musician (Bass is Base)
 Jess Walton – actress (The Young and the Restless)

Gallery

See also
List of high schools in Ontario

References

External links

Loretto Alumnae Association
Loretto Sisters (Canadian Region of the Institute of the Blessed Virgin Mary)

High schools in Toronto
1847 establishments in Canada
Private schools in Toronto
Girls' schools in Canada
Toronto Catholic District School Board
North York